is a Japanese anime music producer currently affiliated with Victor Entertainment.  His hired works include Savage Genius and Yuki Kajiura.

Staff in
 .hack//Liminality (music producer)
 .hack//SIGN (music producer)
 Aquarian Age: Sign for Evolution (music producer, ending theme arrangement)
 The Big O (music producer)
 Bakumatsu Kikansetsu Irohanihoheto (music producer)
 Bubblegum Crisis Tokyo 2040 (music producer)
 Burst Angel (music producer)
 Chocotto Sister (music producer)
 Excel Saga (music producer)
 Gear Fighter Dendoh (music producer)
 Hand Maid May (music producer)
 Jubei-chan (music producer)
 L/R: Licensed by Royalty (music producer, opening theme arrangement)
 Madlax (music producer)
 Mobile Suit Gundam MS IGLOO (music producer)
 Mobile Suit Gundam SEED (music producer)
 Mobile Suit Gundam SEED C.E. 73: Stargazer (music producer)
 Mobile Suit Gundam SEED Destiny (music producer)
 Pandora Hearts  (music producer)
 Simoun (music producer)
 The SoulTaker (music producer)
 Uta Kata (music producer, opening and ending theme arrangement)
 Witch Hunter Robin (music producer)
 You're Under Arrest (music producer)

External links
 
 

1961 births
Japanese male musicians
Japanese musicians
Living people